Barbie Nail Designer is a 1998 video game within the Barbie franchise, published by Mattel Interactive, and released in September 1998. In the week ending October 24, it was the third bestselling game after Deer Hunter II and Need for Speed 3. In the week ending November 14, the game was one of the top three best selling titles alongside Barbie Riding Club and Railroad Tycoon II.  In the week ending December 5, 1998, it was the seventh bestselling game. According to Happy Puppy, the title is "nothing like a game".

References 

1998 video games
Barbie video games
Mattel video games
Video games developed in the United States
Windows games
Windows-only games